Bridge in Upper Frederick Township is a historic stone arch bridge located at Fagleysville in Upper Frederick Township, Montgomery County, Pennsylvania. The bridge was built in 1854. The bridge crosses Swamp Creek.

It was listed on the National Register of Historic Places in 1988.

References 

Road bridges on the National Register of Historic Places in Pennsylvania
Bridges completed in 1854
Bridges in Montgomery County, Pennsylvania
National Register of Historic Places in Montgomery County, Pennsylvania
1854 establishments in Pennsylvania
Upper Frederick Township, Montgomery County, Pennsylvania
Stone arch bridges in the United States